El Djazairia One formerly El Djazairia Tv ( – ) ( "The Algerian") was an Arabic language satellite television channel broadcasting from Hydra, Algeria. El Djazairia was set up by Yousef Qasim with a number of Arab intellectuals from Algeria and the Arab World.

On 23 August 2021, The Ministry of Communication and the Audiovisual Regulatory Authority (ARAV) announced in a joint statement, the "immediate and definitive" closure of the channel "El Djazairia One" for reasons related to "non-compliance requirements of public order" and others in connection with legal proceedings against the founders and managers of this channel.

Programming

News and current affairs

Lifestyle and variety shows 
 
 
 
 
 
 
 
 
 
 
 
 FRA How It's Made ( 2016)
 
 
 ALG Pano Cine ( 2016)

Religious series

Dramas and comedies

Animated series

Brand identity

References

External links
  

Arab mass media
Television in Algeria
Arabic-language television stations
Arabic-language television
Television channels and stations established in 2012
Television stations in Algeria